Rick Trevino is the second studio album by the Hispanic-American country music singer of the same name. His second major-label album, it was released in 1994 on Columbia Records Nashville. It produced the singles "Just Enough Rope", "Honky Tonk Crowd", "She Can't Say I Didn't Cry", and "Doctor Time", which peaked at #44, #35, #3, and #5, respectively, on the Billboard country charts. "Walk out Backwards" was a top ten country single for Bill Anderson in 1960 and appeared on his 1962 album Bill Anderson Sings Country Heart Songs. Trevino also recorded "Walk Out Backwards" in Spanish on his previous album, 1993's Dos Mundos. "Honky Tonk Crowd" by Marty Stuart appeared on his 1992 album This One's Gonna Hurt You.

Track listing

ASpanish translation by José Flores and Victor Guerra.

Personnel

Musicians
Eddie Bayers – drums
Mark Casstevens – acoustic guitar
Paul Franklin – steel guitar
Sonny Garrish – steel guitar
Steve Gibson – acoustic guitar, mandolin
Rob Hajacos – fiddle
David Hungate – bass guitar
Roy Huskey Jr. – upright bass
John Barlow Jarvis – piano
Brent Mason – electric guitar
Randy McCormick – piano
Joey Miskulin – accordion
Don Potter – acoustic guitar
Tom Robb – bass guitar
Hargus "Pig" Robbins – piano
John Wesley Ryles – background vocals
Rick Trevino – lead vocals, background vocals, acoustic guitar, piano
Dennis Wilson – background vocals

Production
Chuck Ainlay – mixing
Steve Buckingham – producer
Pat Hutchinson – assistant engineer
Ken Hutton – assistant engineer
Cari Landers – assistant producer
Graham Lewis – assistant engineer
Marshall Morgan – engineer, mixing
Toby Seay – assistant engineer
Ed Simonton – assistant engineer

Chart performance

References

Rick Trevino albums
1994 albums
Columbia Records albums
Albums produced by Steve Buckingham (record producer)